The Department of Fine Arts of the Faculty of Arts, Chinese University of Hong Kong, was founded in 1957 as part of New Asia College.

History
The department was founded in 1957 within New Asia College. It initially offered a two-year study programme. One of the founding professors was Chen Shih Wen, who trained at several art schools in France and had previously taught in Shanghai.

The two-year fine arts training programme was expanded to a four-year programme in 1959. Students were required to take courses in Chinese history and literature, as the curriculum emphasized the close relationship between these subjects and Chinese art.

In 1963, the Chinese University of Hong Kong (CUHK) was founded, consisting of three existing Chinese-language post-secondary colleges, namely: New Asia College, United College, and Chung Chi College.

In 1973, New Asia College moved from Farm Road in Kowloon to its newly built campus at CUHK, where it remains today. The Cheng Ming Building was built to accommodate the college administration and the Department of Fine Arts.

The Alumni Association of the Fine Arts Department was established in 1982.

Campus
The Department of Fine Arts is based in the Cheng Ming Building and Humanities Building of New Asia College, within the CUHK campus in Shatin.

Notable people

Alumni

Teaching staff

See also
 Chinese University of Hong Kong Art Museum

Further reading

References

External links
 

1957 establishments in Hong Kong
Art schools in Hong Kong
Chinese University of Hong Kong
New Asia College